Port Elgin may refer to:

Port Elgin, New Brunswick, Canada
Port Elgin, Ontario, Canada